Iga Natalia Świątek (born 31 May 2001) is a Polish professional tennis player. She is currently ranked world No. 1 by the Women's Tennis Association (WTA). Świątek is a three-time major singles champion, having won the French Open in 2020 and 2022 and the US Open in 2022. She is the first player representing Poland to win a major singles title. She has won a total of 12 WTA Tour-level titles.

Świątek's father Tomasz is a retired Olympic rower. As a junior, Świątek was the 2018 French Open girls' doubles champion alongside Caty McNally and the 2018 Wimbledon girls' singles champion. Świątek began playing regularly on the WTA Tour in 2019, and entered the top 50 at 18 years old after her maiden WTA final and a fourth-round appearance at the 2019 French Open.

During her French Open title run in 2020, Świątek did not lose more than five games in any singles match. She entered the top ten of the WTA rankings for the first time in May 2021 after winning the Italian Open. Following back-to-back WTA 1000 titles in 2022 at Qatar and Indian Wells, Świątek reached a career-high ranking of No. 2 on 21 March 2022. On retirement of world No. 1 Ashleigh Barty, she gained the top ranking on 4 April 2022. She also won another WTA 1000 title in Miami, becoming the fourth woman to win the Sunshine Double. During this time, Świątek accumulated a 37-match winning streak, the longest on the WTA Tour in the 21st century.

Świątek has an all-court playing style. She won the WTA Fan Favorite Shot of the Year in 2019 with a drop shot from the baseline, and was voted WTA Fan Favorite Singles Player of the Year in 2020. She is the winner of the L'Equipe Champion of Champions of 2023. She was Polish Sports Personality of the Year in 2023.

Early life and background
Iga Świątek was born on 31 May 2001 in Warsaw to Dorota and Tomasz Świątek. Her father is a former rower who competed in the men's quadruple sculls event at the 1988 Seoul Olympics. Her mother is an orthodontist. She has a sister Agata who is about three years older and is a dentist.

Świątek's father wanted his daughters to become competitive athletes and preferred they take up an individual sport rather than a team sport to have better control of their chances of success. Agata initially started out as a swimmer, but switched to tennis after she had issues with swimming. Iga followed her sister into tennis because she wanted to beat her and also because she wanted to be more like her. Agata briefly competed on the ITF Junior Circuit in 2013 at about 15 years old, but stopped playing due to injury troubles. Iga trained at Mera Warsaw as a 14-year-old before later moving to Legia Warsaw.

Junior career

Świątek reached a career-high ranking of No. 5 as a junior. She began competing in ITF Junior Circuit events in 2015 and won back-to-back low-level Grade 4 titles in April and May at age 13. Before the end of the year, she moved up to Grade 2 events and finished runner-up in both singles and doubles at the Czech Junior Open. Świątek made her junior Grand Slam debut in 2016 at the French Open, reaching the quarterfinals in both singles and doubles. She followed this up with her best junior title to date at the Grade 1 Canadian Open Junior Championships, defeating Olga Danilović in the final.

Świątek had a strong first half of 2017. She won both the singles and doubles titles at the Grade 1 Traralgon Junior International. Although she lost her opening round match at the Australian Open, she partnered with compatriot Maja Chwalińska to make her first final in a Grand Slam event, finishing runner-up in doubles to the North American team of Bianca Andreescu and Carson Branstine. She then reached her first Grade A singles final at the Trofeo Bonfiglio, losing to Elena Rybakina. Her season came to an end after another quarterfinal at the French Open, after which she had right ankle surgery that kept her out for seven months.

Despite only competing in two Grand Slam tournaments in 2018 and three singles events in total, Świątek finished her junior career with her best season. She returned to the junior tour at the French Open after a one-year absence and reached the semifinals in singles, losing to Caty McNally. She fared better in doubles, partnering with McNally to win her first junior Grand Slam title. They defeated the Japanese team of Yuki Naito and Naho Sato in the final.

Świątek played only singles at Wimbledon. As an unseeded player due to her absence, she was drawn against top seed Whitney Osuigwe in the first round. After winning that match in three sets, she did not drop another set during the rest of the tournament and won the championship for her only junior Grand Slam singles title. She defeated Leonie Küng in the final.
Świątek then teamed up with the Slovenian Kaja Juvan to compete in the 2018 Summer Youth Olympics. They reached the final and defeated the Japanese team of Yuki Naito and Naho Sato. She then finished her junior career.

Professional career

2016–18: Undefeated in seven ITF finals

Świątek began competing on the ITF Women's Circuit in 2016 and played on the circuit through the end of 2018. She won all seven ITF singles finals she reached, ranging from the first four at the $10K to $15K level to one at the $25k level followed up by two at the $60K level. Her first three titles came at 15 years old. The fourth was in February 2018 in her first tournament back from a seven-month layoff due to injury. After a $25k title in April, Świątek moved up to higher-level ITF events later that month. Following her junior Wimbledon title in July, she skipped the junior US Open to stay in Europe. During the two weeks of the US Open, she won back-to-back $60k titles at the NEK Ladies Open in Hungary and the Montreux Ladies Open in Switzerland. During the second event, she defeated top seed and world No. 120 Mariana Duque-Mariño. These were Świątek's last two ITF tournaments of the year. With these two titles, Świątek entered the top 200 for the first time at the age of 17, rising from No. 298 to No. 180 in those two weeks.

2019: First WTA final, top 50 debut

Despite never playing on the WTA Tour before 2019, Świątek was able to compete in only tour-level events throughout the year. After failing to qualify at the Auckland Open, she qualified for her first major main draw at the Australian Open. She then defeated No. 82 Ana Bogdan, in three sets, in her debut match to reach the second round. At her next three tournaments, she also qualified at the Hungarian Ladies Open, but not either of the Premier Mandatory events in March.

Świątek made her first WTA breakthrough at the Ladies Open Lugano in April. With her first direct acceptance into a main draw, she made her first WTA final. During the event, she upset No. 3 seed Viktória Kužmová in the second round for her first top 50 victory. She ultimately finished runner-up to Polona Hercog in three sets. Moreover, a precise cross-court forehand drop shot she hit against Kristýna Plíšková in the semifinal was voted the 2019 WTA Shot of the Year. With the runner-up, she also made her debut in the top 100 while still 17 years old. Świątek closed out her clay court season with a fourth round appearance at the French Open in her second major. She upset No. 16 Wang Qiang in the second round for her first top 20 victory before losing to defending champion Simona Halep.

Świątek could not repeat her French Open success at the remaining Grand Slam events of the year, losing her opening match at Wimbledon and in the second round at the US Open. Her best result in the second half of the season was a third round appearance at the Canadian Open. During the event, she upset No. 18, Caroline Wozniacki, before losing to No. 2, Naomi Osaka. With this result, she entered the top 50 for the first time a week later. She missed the rest of the season after the US Open to undergo foot surgery and finished the year at No. 61 in the world.

2020: French Open champion, top 20 debut

Świątek made her return to the WTA Tour at the Australian Open. She matched her best result at a Grand Slam tournament with another fourth-round appearance, this time highlighted by a victory over No. 20, Donna Vekić. She defeated Vekić again at the Qatar Open, her last match win before the WTA Tour was shut down for six months due to the COVID-19 pandemic. Świątek continued her Grand Slam success once the tour resumed. She reached the third round at the US Open, losing to eventual runner-up Victoria Azarenka.

Entering the rescheduled French Open in September, Świątek was ranked No. 54 in the world. Nonetheless, she won the singles event for her maiden WTA title. During the tournament, she defeated 2019 runner-up and world No. 19, Markéta Vondroušová, in the opening round. Her biggest upset was a victory in the fourth round over top seed and world No. 2, Simona Halep, who was on a 17-match win streak and was also the heavy favourite to win the title. She only lost three games against Halep after winning just one game against her in the same round of the French Open the previous year. Świątek defeated world No. 6, Sofia Kenin, in the final to become the first Polish player to win a Grand Slam singles title and the lowest-ranked French Open champion in the history of the WTA rankings. She also became the youngest singles champion at the tournament since Rafael Nadal in 2005 and the youngest women's singles winner since Monica Seles in 1992. She won the title without dropping a set or more than five games to any opponent, and the 28 games she lost in total were tied for the second-fewest among French Open singles champions in the Open Era behind only the 20 games Steffi Graf lost in 1988. With the title, Świątek rose to No. 17 in the world. She also played the doubles event, partnering with Nicole Melichar for the first time. The pair reached the semifinals, and also did not drop a set until their last match.

2021: WTA 1000 title, French Open doubles final, world No. 4

At the Australian Open, Świątek was seeded 15th and recorded wins over Arantxa Rus, Camila Giorgi and Fiona Ferro. She reached the fourth round where she lost to Simona Halep, in three sets. At Adelaide, she won her first WTA Tour title without dropping a set in the whole tournament. She defeated Belinda Bencic in the final, in straight sets. As a result, she entered the top 15 for the first time in her career, in March 2021.

Seeded 15th, Świątek won her first career WTA 1000-title at the Italian Open, defeating former champion Karolína Plíšková in just 46 minutes without the loss of a single game. She advanced to the final after defeating two-time champion and world No. 5, Elina Svitolina, and the second best-ranked teenager Coco Gauff on the same day, as well as saving match points in her third-round match against Barbora Krejčíková. Świątek became the third player to win a title after saving match point en route in 2021, alongside Naomi Osaka at the Australian Open and Ashleigh Barty in Miami. She also became the fourth teenager to win a WTA 1000 event. This successful run to her third career title moved her into the top 10 in the singles rankings on 17 May 2021, as world No. 9.

At the French Open, Świątek was seeded at No. 8. She opened her title defense winning against Kaja Juvan in the first round, and then defeated Rebecca Peterson, Anett Kontaveit and Marta Kostyuk. She won 22 straight sets at the French Open but then lost in the quarterfinals to Maria Sakkari. In doubles, seeded 14th with Bethanie Mattek-Sands as a pair, playing just their third event together, they reached the final where they were defeated by Barbora Krejčíková and Kateřina Siniaková in straight sets. As a result, Świątek reached the top 50 at a career-high ranking of No. 42 in doubles for the first time in her career.

She started her grass-court season at the Eastbourne International where she was seeded at No. 4. After defeating Heather Watson, she lost to Daria Kasatkina in the second round. As the seventh seed at Wimbledon, Świątek defeated Hsieh Su-wei, Vera Zvonareva, and Irina-Camelia Begu, all in straight sets. In the fourth round, she lost to Ons Jabeur, in three sets.

With her win over Anett Kontaveit in the third round of the US Open, she became the only player to have reached the second week of all four Grand Slam championships in the 2021 season.

She qualified for the WTA Finals for the first time in her career.

2022: World No. 1, two majors, 37-match winning streak

Świątek started her season by reaching semi-finals at the Adelaide International. She then reached another semi-finals at the Australian Open. Following a second-round match loss against Jeļena Ostapenko, Świątek won the next six tournaments she entered — Qatar Open, Indian Wells Open, Miami Open, Stuttgart Open, Italian Open and French Open — before losing to Alizé Cornet at Wimbledon in the third round.

Świątek reached world No. 1 singles ranking, and became the fourth as well as the youngest woman (11th player overall) to complete the Sunshine Double in the progress. She also accumulated a 37-match win streak, the longest in the 21st century.

Świątek had a lacklustre performance throughout the summer. She lost to Caroline Garcia in the quarterfinals in Warsaw, Beatriz Haddad Maia in the third round in Toronto and Madison Keys in the third round in Cincinnati. However, she returned on form at the US Open, winning her third major by defeating Ons Jabeur in the final.

Świątek reached the final At Ostrava Open, but she lost to Barbora Krejčíková in a three-set match that lasted 3 hours and 16 minutes, the longest match of her career so far. She subsequently played at San Diego Open, winning her eighth title by defeating Donna Vekić in three sets.

At the 2022 WTA Finals held in Fort Worth, Texas, Świątek won the group stage without dropping a set defeating Daria Kasatkina, Caroline Garcia and Coco Gauff respectively. However, she was upset by Aryna Sabalenka in the semifinals in three sets. Nevertheless, she finished the season as year-end no.1 and posted a record win-loss 67–9 in 2022, the most wins in a single season since Serena Williams in 2013. She also became the first player since Serena Williams in 2013 to collect over 11,000 ranking points in a single season.

2023: Twelfth title, 50th consecutive week at No. 1 

Świątek started 2023 as only the fourth woman in WTA history to be ranked world No. 1 for 40 or more consecutive weeks in their first stint as the top-ranked player. In her first tournament of the year representing Poland at the United Cup in Brisbane, Świątek defeated Yulia Putintseva, Belinda Bencic and Martina Trevisan on the way to the semifinals where she lost to Jessica Pegula in straight sets.

At the 2023 Australian Open, the top seeded Świątek reached the fourth round after winning against Jule Niemeier, Camila Osorio and Cristina Bucșa. In the fourth round she was defeated by reigning Wimbledon champion Elena Rybakina in straight sets.

In February 2023, Świątek successfully defended her title at the WTA 500 2023 Qatar Total Open. She defeated Jessica Pegula in the final in straight sets. This was her first title of the year and the twelfth of her career. She did not drop a set throughout the tournament and only lost five games. Later it emerged that Świątek had launched  into a 5 minute 34 second 
profanity laden rant at start of tournament an off-record conversation  that had been captured on tape and leaked onto social media in which Świątek complained about excessively negative coverage of her, the rant included at least 88 obscenities according to the Las Vegas Sun. Swiatek  said that she used "wholly inappropriate language" to describe the media coverage of her and she  said she was sorry for her choice of words, yet stands by the content of her message. In Dubai, she defeated Leylah Fernandez, 14th seed Liudmila Samsonova, Karolina Pliskova (by walkover) and fifth seed Coco Gauff all matches in straight sets with only nine games lost to reach the final. She lost to former world No. 2, Barbora Krejčíková in straight sets, ending her six match winning streak.

On 13 March she reached her 50th consecutive week at world No. 1 tying Steffi Graf, Serena Williams and Martina Hingis.
At the 2023 BNP Paribas Open she reached the fourth round defeating former Indian Wells champion and 32nd seed Bianca Andreescu in straight sets. She reached the quarterfinals, defeating another former Grand Slam champion Emma Raducanu also in straight sets. However, she lost once again to Elena Rybakina in the semifinals, preventing Świątek from defending her Indian Wells title.

National representation

Junior competitions

Świątek represented Poland at the ITF World Junior Tennis Finals for 14-and-under girls twice in 2014 and 2015. She won all of her matches in 2014 to lead Poland to a ninth-place finish out of 16 teams. The following year, she helped Poland go undefeated in the round robin stage to reach the semifinals. Świątek moved up to the 16-and-under Junior Fed Cup in 2016, where she played alongside Maja Chwalińska and Stefania Rogozińska-Dzik. Poland won the title, defeating the United States 2–1 in the final. Świątek won both of her rubbers in the final tie, defeating Amanda Anisimova in singles before partnering with Chwalińska to defeat Caty McNally and Claire Liu in the decisive doubles rubber. The last event of Świątek's junior career was the 2018 Summer Youth Olympic Games. Although she lost in the quarterfinals in singles to Clara Burel, she partnered with Slovenian Kaja Juvan to win the gold medal in doubles. In the final they defeated Naito and Sato, who were also Świątek's opponents in the French Open doubles final earlier in the year.

Billie Jean King Cup
Świątek made her senior Billie Jean King Cup debut in 2018 when Poland was in Europe/Africa Zone Group I. To advance out of this group, Poland needed to win their round-robin group, a play-off tie against one of the other round robin group winners, and then another play-off tie as part of the separate World Group II Play-off round. They did not win their round-robin group in 2018 or 2019. Świątek won her only singles match in 2018. While she only won one of her three singles matches in 2019, she won both of her doubles rubbers while partnering with Alicja Rosolska. The following year, the format was changed so that Poland only needed to finish in the top two out of three teams in their round-robin group to reach the promotional play-off. Nonetheless, they won their group and defeated Sweden 2–0 in the play-off to advance to the separate Play-off round. Świątek won all three of her singles matches in the 2020 Europe/Africa Zone Group I round, before skipping the Play-offs themselves. The following edition in 2022 had Poland facing Romania in the Qualifying Round, with Świątek winning her two games to help the team move on to the  Finals. However, she did not attend the finals because the decisive round started very soon after the 2022 WTA Finals.  Overall, Świątek has a 9–3 record at the Fed Cup, comprising 7–2 in singles and 2–1 in doubles.

Playing style

Świątek has an aggressive, all-court style of play and incorporates a lot of variety into her game. Because her game style is focused on offence, she typically generates high amounts of both winners and unforced errors. She has described her style of play on clay as "a big serve, topspin, and backhand down the line". Despite her aggressive style of play, she plays with margin, and constructs points carefully until she creates an opportunity to hit a winner, and in all seven of her matches played at the 2020 French Open, she hit more winners than unforced errors. In total at the French Open that year, she hit 175 winners to 127 unforced errors. The basis of Świątek's game was described by tennis journalist Christopher Clarey for The New York Times as: her sliding ability, allowing her to defend from the corners à la Kim Clijsters and Novak Djokovic, a "sprinter's speed" when moving forward to the net, power and topspin akin to her idol Rafael Nadal, and mental strength forged through sports psychology.

She possesses an effective kick serve, and an effective slice serve, which are deployed as second serves, preventing opponents from scoring free points. She also regularly uses the drop shot, and won the 2019 WTA Shot of the Year with a cross-court drop shot from the baseline that landed on the sideline well inside the service box. Świątek aims to gain the advantage in a point by hitting the ball early on the rise. Further strengths include her exceptional speed, movement, and court coverage, detailed and intricate footwork, and intelligent point construction. Świątek is also notable for her positive mental attitude, calm demeanour and composure under pressure, which has been credited to her work with sports psychologist Daria Abramowicz. Indicative of her positive mindset, Świątek often yells "Jazda!" when she wins a point, meaning "Let's go!" in English. Her favourite surface is clay, having grown up playing on that surface, although she has had success on all surfaces. Her clay court success is enhanced by her ability to slide on the surface; as her career has progressed, she has also developed the ability to slide on hard and grass courts, too.

Świątek is a very popular player on the WTA Tour. She finished runner-up to Simona Halep in the voting for the WTA Fan Favorite Singles Player of the Year award in 2019. In 2020, she was voted the WTA Fan Favorite Singles Player of the Year.

Coaching team
Świątek's primary coach in her early junior years was Michał Kaznowski, who she worked with up to the 2016 French Open. Jolanta Rusin-Krzepota was her physical preparation trainer for almost four years through the end of the 2019 US Open.
Świątek was coached by Piotr Sierzputowski beginning in 2016. While Sierzputowski was her coach, British former professional tennis player and former Polish Davis Cup coach Nick Brown also served as a main consultant on occasion. Świątek also works with sports psychologist  and fitness trainer/physiologist Maciej Ryszczuk.

In December 2021, Świątek announced that she was splitting from Sierzputowski after nearly six years working together. She wrote, "This change is really challenging for me, and this decision wasn't easy, either". Świątek had hired Sierzputowski when she was 15 and still playing in junior tournaments. Her current coach is Tomasz Wiktorowski, who previously coached Agnieszka Radwańska.

Endorsements
Świątek has been sponsored by Asics for clothing since the start of 2020. She was previously sponsored by Nike. Świątek is also endorsed by the Red Bull energy drink company, the Chinese tech giant Xiaomi and the Lexus division of the Toyota automaker company, the latter of which have also sponsored fellow Polish tennis player Agnieszka Radwańska. In 2021, Świątek signed an endorsement deal with Tecnifibre for racquets; she previously used a Prince Textreme 100 Tour racquet, although she was not under contract with the company. To celebrate the victory at Roland-Garros 2022 with a Tecnifibre racquet and to recognise the female athlete, the company is changing its marketing name to Swiateknifibre and its trademark to the colours white and red for seven days. It was the first women's Grand Slam title for this manufacturer.
Świątek's father also confirmed that she had also signed a contract with Rolex in 2021. Since February 2021, her main partner is Poland's biggest insurance company PZU. After winning her third Grand Slam title at the 2022 US Open, Świątek parted ways with her long-term manager, and began to be represented by IMG. In 2023, Swiatek announced that she has become a global ambassador for the Polish sports drink Oshee. She will also release collaboration line with the brand, including her own drink flavour and bottle design.

Charity work and philanthropy

Since 2021 Świątek has been involved with The Great Orchestra of Christmas Charity. She has put up her winning racket from final of her first French Open, the racket ended up getting sold with the price of 131,300 zł, which outpriced the signed Champions League winning kit of Robert Lewandowski, money helped to fund new equipment for pediatric ENT, otolaryngology and head diagnostics. In 2022, while playing at the Australian Open, she put up another racket this time from final of Italian Open, but this time the offer, also included training with the buyer. Besides the racket Świątek also put her signed Tokyo Olympics 2020 kit, her signature cap and multiple tennis balls with autographs up for auction. Offer yet again was met with a lot of interest and in the end was sold for 189,100 zł, which was second best seller. Money would help to fund equipment for pediatric ophthalmology. In 2023, Świątek has put up her winning racket with which she won both US Open and French Open in 2022, besides the racket she also included double invitation to her first round match in Roland Garros 2023 and an opportunity to meet her in person behind the scenes after the match. The pass would also allow the winners of the auction to watch all matches on the said day for free. All proceeds would fund the medication for sepsis. Swiatek's offer was auctioned for 300,300 zł, making it the most expensive auction.

Świątek and her team have also been taking part in the Noble Gift project since 2020. It helps to provide families that have found themselves in difficult financial circumstances for reasons beyond their control during the Christmas period.

Świątek also took part in auction for SOS Children's Villages- Poland, putting up her autographed cap from Miami Open. In one of interviews the teacher from Świątek's elementary school in Raszyn revealed that after winning her second French Open title, she pledged to help upgrade the school's sports facilities, among which was a single tennis court. She also donated the shirt she wore in the final, tennis balls and her cap to the school, all signed for auction to raise money for one of the students who needed urgent and expensive medical treatment.

In November 2021 Świątek was announced in line-up for Africa Cares Tennis Challenge tennis exhibition in Johannesburg, which was aimed to not only promote tennis in South Africa but was to be used as a vehicle in the fight against Gender-Based Violence through campaigns and activations leading up to the main event. Other players in the line-up included Simona Halep, Venus Williams, Sloane Stephens and Martina Hingis. On 30 November it was announced event was cancelled due to concerns regarding growing amount of cases of Covid-19 infections.

Advocating for mental health awareness

On 10 October 2021, Świątek donated $50,000 of her prize money in support of World Mental Health Day, after progressing to the last 16 of the BNP Paribas Open at Indian Wells. "I would say in sports, for me, it was always important to use that kind of help because I always thought that in my mental toughness there is some strength that I can use on court and I can also develop in that manner," she said. After winning in at the French Open in 2020, Świątek revealed that using her sports psychologist (Daria Abramowicz) had helped her get over the line. "It's just good to stay open-minded. If you need that kind of help, then go for it. If you're up to it and if you're open-minded, I think it helps a lot," Świątek added.

In her runner-up speech after losing the final to Barbora Krejčíková on AGEL's Ostrava Open on 9 October 2022, Świątek announced she will donate all of her prize money (€58,032) won in the tournament to Polish non-profit organizations and foundations to celebrate World Mental Health Day. "This is the most difficult moment of this tournament for me. I do not know what to say. Thank you so much. Whether I win or not, I am fulfilling my dreams, and you with me. I wish I won cause I would be able to donate more but I would like to announce that I will donate my prize money to non-profit organisations in Poland on Monday, which is World Mental Health Day. I hope this money can help a lot of people and make some change".

Support of Ukraine
Following the Russian invasion of Ukraine in 2022, Świątek has often worn ribbons or other accessories in Ukrainian colors, and on several occasions has publicly declared her support for Ukraine in her winner speeches.

On 23 July 2022, Świątek hosted a charity tennis event in Kraków, Poland to raise funds for children and teenagers impacted by the war in Ukraine. The one-day event featured a mixed doubles exhibition match and a set of singles between Świątek and Agnieszka Radwańska. Ukraine football great Andriy Shevchenko was a special guest. Elina Svitolina of Ukraine served as umpire for the event. Świątek stated, "I hope that we can see each other in large numbers in TAURON Arena Krakow and in front of the television to show the strength of sport when it unites us in helping and gives us at least a little joy." Swiatek later announced on Twitter that the event has raised over 2,5 mln złoty (over €500,000), which would be spread between United 24, Elina Svitolina Foundation and UNICEF Poland.

On 10 August, Świątek has been announced as the part of line up for "Tennis Plays for Peace" exhibition, which took place on 24 August with other numerous current and former tennis stars like Rafael Nadal, Carlos Alcaraz, Coco Gauff, John McEnroe, Stefanos Tsitsipas, Matteo Berrettini, Maria Sakkari and many others, 100% of the proceeds going to GlobalGiving, the international non-profit identified by Tennis Plays for Peace.

On 9 January 2023, Świątek took to Twitter and Instagram to announce that her 'Iga & Friends' and '1ga' T-shirts will be available for sale at Allegro Charity, where she and UNICEF Poland have once again joined forces to raise funds for children in war-torn Ukraine. On 11 January, Świątek once again announced on her social media platforms that she will be auctioning off her US Open winning gear and Roland Garros shoes, among others all proceeds would also be going straight to UNICEF.

Personal life
Świątek is a cat lover and owns a black female cat named Grappa. She enjoys reading novels and listening to music. Before her matches, she listens to rock music, especially Pearl Jam, Pink Floyd, Red Hot Chili Peppers, and AC/DC. In her spare time, she listens to alternative music, jazz, soul and pop. She is also a fan of Taylor Swift. In an interview with Tennis Channel, she described Mikaela Shiffrin as a good role model and said she "really respects" her. She also mentioned she's a fan of actress Sandra Bullock and her films. 
Besides being a successful sportswoman Swiatek was always known as an excellent and diligent student in primary and high-school. Despite her tour schedules she always studied during the tournaments before coming back to school in person to pass the tests. Swiatek before her success at the French Open in 2020 had finished her high school with excellent results in her high-school leaving examination, better known as Egzamin Maturalny, with 83% for Polish at basic level, 100% for English at basic level, 96% for Advanced English and 100% for Mathematics. She also admitted that she would like to go to university and study something related to mathematics later in life.

Świątek is a known book lover on the WTA tour, for every tournament she usually brings different books from Agatha Christie, George Orwell and Alexandre Dumas to more classic books like Wuthering Heights or The Great Gatsby. She openly admits that books help her concentrate on tournaments and help her to not use her phone "for longer than needed".

On 4 December 2021, Justice Uche Agomoh of the Federal High Court of Nigeria sentenced Olugbenga Ogunrinde to 10 months in prison for impersonating Świątek in a correctional centre over 300 dollar cyber fraud. The prosecutor revealed that intelligence obtained from Ogunrinde's email address indicated that he had been operating as Świątek and using her name and fame to scam money from foreigners.

Career statistics and records

Grand Slam tournament performance timelines

Singles

Doubles

Grand Slam tournament finals

Singles: 3 (3 titles)

Doubles: 1 (1 runner-up)

Records

 Only played three matches.

Awards
2019
 WTA Fan Favorite Shot of the Year

2020
 WTA Most Improved Player
 WTA Fan Favorite Singles Player
 Gold Cross of Merit
 European Sportswoman of the Year – Evgen Bergant Trophy 

2022
 Chris Evert WTA World No.1 Trophy
 WTA Player of the Year
 ITF World Champion
 WTA Fan Favourite Shot of the Year
 European Sportsperson of the Year

2023
 Polish Sports Personality of the Year
 L'Équipe Champion of Champions

Notes

References

External links

 
 
 
 Iga Świątek at the Tennis Board
 The Players Tribune. 12 January 2023. Personal Essay – The Story of a Polish Introvert by Iga Swiatek. 
  

2001 births
Living people
French Open champions
French Open junior champions
Grand Slam (tennis) champions in girls' doubles
Grand Slam (tennis) champions in girls' singles
Grand Slam (tennis) champions in women's singles
Olympic tennis players of Poland
Polish female tennis players
Tennis players at the 2018 Summer Youth Olympics
Tennis players at the 2020 Summer Olympics
Tennis players from Warsaw
US Open (tennis) champions
Wimbledon junior champions
WTA number 1 ranked singles tennis players
ITF World Champions
Youth Olympic gold medalists for Poland